Eunidia tripunctata is a species of beetle in the family Cerambycidae. It was described by Per Olof Christopher Aurivillius in 1911.

Subspecies
 Eunidia tripunctata nigricornis Breuning, 1950
 Eunidia tripunctata tripunctata Aurivillius, 1911

References

Eunidiini
Beetles described in 1911